The monk saki (Pithecia monachus) also known as Geoffroy's monk saki, is a species of saki monkey, a type of New World monkey, from South America. It is found in forested areas of northwestern Brazil and northeastern Peru.

Taxonomy 
The hairy saki (P. hirsuta), Miller's saki (P. milleri), Napo saki (P. napensis), and burnished saki (P. inusta) were previously considered conspecific but were split from this species in 2014. P. monachus is now known to occupy a much smaller range than it was thought to before the split.

Distribution 
This species is found in the interfluvial between the Solimoes River, lower to middle Ucayali River and lower Javary River, in northwestern Brazil and northeastern Peru.

Description 
It has coarse fur, which is long and shaggy around the face and neck.

Behavior 
A shy, wary animal, it is totally arboreal, living high in the trees and sometimes descending to lower levels but not to the ground. It generally moves on all fours but may sometimes walk upright on a large branch and will leap across gaps. During the day, it moves in pairs or small family groups, feeding on fruits, berries, honey, some leaves, small mammals such as mice and bats, and birds. The female gives birth to 1 young per mating season with the average family size being 4.5.

References

monk saki
Primates of South America
Mammals of Brazil
Mammals of Peru
monk saki
Monk saki